The WABA League is a top-level regional basketball league, featuring female teams from Serbia, Montenegro, Bosnia and Herzegovina, Bulgaria, Slovenia and Croatia. In the Regular season was played with 8 teams and play a dual circuit system, each with each one game at home and away. The four best teams at the end of the regular season were placed in the Final Four. The regular season began on 3 October 2018 and it will end on 6 March 2019.

Standings

Fixtures and results
All times given below are in Central European Time (for the matches played in Bulgaria is time expressed in Eastern European Time).

Game 1

Game 2

Game 3

Game 4

Game 5

Game 6

Game 7

Game 8

Game 9

Game 10

Game 11

Game 12

Game 13

Game 14

Game 15

Game 16

Game 17

Game 18

References

External links
Official website

Regular season